The 2015 NAIA Division I women's basketball tournament was the tournament held by the NAIA to determine the national champion of women's college basketball among its Division I members in the United States and Canada for the 2014–15 basketball season.

Defending champions Oklahoma City defeated Campbellsville in the championship game, 80–63, to claim the Stars' eighth NAIA national title.

The tournament was played at the Independence Events Center in Independence, Missouri.

Qualification

The tournament field remained fixed at thirty-two teams, which were sorted into four quadrants of eight teams each. Within each quadrant, teams were seeded sequentially from one to eight based on record and season performance.

The tournament continued to utilize a simple single-elimination format.

Bracket

See also
2015 NAIA Division I men's basketball tournament
2015 NCAA Division I women's basketball tournament
2015 NCAA Division II women's basketball tournament
2015 NCAA Division III women's basketball tournament
2015 NAIA Division II women's basketball tournament

References

NAIA
NAIA Women's Basketball Championships
2015 in sports in Missouri